Lundey (Icelandic: , "Puffin Island") is a small, uninhabited island off the western coast of Reykjavík, Iceland in  Faxaflói Bay. There is one structure present on the island.

There are two other islands known as Lundey, both in northern Iceland; One in Skjálfandi Bay and another in Skagafjörður Fjord.

Environment
The island serves as a haven for seabirds, including Atlantic puffins, black guillemots, fulmars and Arctic terns.

References

Uninhabited islands of Iceland
Islands of Iceland